The M4 Road is a road in the Copperbelt Province of Zambia. The Road connects the city of Ndola (Capital of the Copperbelt) with the city of Mufulira. The route extends to connect Mufulira with the city of Kitwe. As it is a v-shaped route, the M4 Road starts and ends at a junction with the T3 Road.

It is the only route that connects the south-western terminus of the Congo Pedicle road coming from Luapula Province (& the town of Mufulira) with the rest of the Copperbelt Province and with roads connecting to neighbouring provinces like the North-Western Province.

Route
The M4 begins at a roundabout by Levy Mwanawasa Stadium in the city of Ndola. It begins at a junction with the T3 Road (Ndola-Kitwe Dual Carriageway).

It is one of the two borders which provides access to the Congo Pedicle Area of DR Congo from the Copperbelt Province of Zambia.

By Mufulira Airport in the Mupambe Suburb, it becomes Chatulinga Street, entering Mufulira in a northwesterly direction. South of Fairview at the Kitwe Road junction, as Chatulinga Street becomes the M5 Road northwards and proceeds through Mufulira Central to become the Congo Pedicle road, the M4 becomes Kitwe Road by way of a left turn.

Road Importance

The Congo Pedicle road is an important road, as it provides a direct shortcut for people travelling from the Copperbelt Province and neighbouring provinces to the Luapula Province (and Northern Province) in northern Zambia. It is a road maintained by Zambia through Congolese territory. The road is from Mufulira, through the Mokambo border into the Congo Pedicle Area of DR Congo, to the Levy Mwanawasa Bridge at the Chembe border post, with the road continuing to the town of Mansa (capital of Luapula Province). The short 15km section from Mufulira Town Centre to the Congo Border is designated as the M5 Road.

As the Congo Pedicle road provides a shorter route to the Luapula Province, it makes the M4 road an important road, as it is the only road that provides the rest of the Copperbelt Province with access to the town of Mufulira and the start of the Congo Pedicle road. Despite being in a poor condition, both the short western section from Kitwe to Mufulira and the long eastern section from Ndola to Mufulira are declared as important roads, as they provide access to a shorter route to Luapula Province than the longer route through the towns of Kapiri Mposhi and Serenje in Central Province.

The Congo Pedicle road proceeds as the shortcut to the Luapula Province, which is a route for people who plan to save on fuel between the two parts of Zambia and who plan to avoid spending hours on the road.

M5 Road
The M5 Road is the short road that connects the M4 Road with the Mokambo Border and the Congo Pedicle road (Shortcut to Luapula Province).

It begins as Chatulinga Street at the junction with the v-shaped M4 Road south of Mufulira town centre, going northwards.

It becomes the M3 Road at the Luapula end of the Congo Pedicle Road. The Congo Pedicle Road is designated as the N36 Route on the DR Congo road network.

See also
Roads in Zambia

References

Roads in Zambia
Copperbelt Province